Ivan Yarendru Therikiratha is a 2017 Indian Tamil-language romantic drama film directed by Suresh Kumar, a former assistant of Suseenthiran. The film stars television actor Vishnu, Varsha Bollamma, and Ishaara Nair in the lead roles. This film marks the lead debut of Vishnu.

Plot 
Arivu (Vishnu) graduates from college and hangs out with his friends (Arjunan and Rajkumar). His father (Jayaprakash) is very fond of him. Naive Arivu is used by both his friends  for their love interests and gets in trouble for his irresponsible acts with his friends. His friends have girlfriends while Arivu is all by himself.  On Valentines Day, Arivu challenges his friends that he can find a girlfriend after both of his friends tease him. He remembers his college classmate, Priya (Ishaara Nair), and goes in search of her. Much to his disappointment, she is married and bears kids. He later meets a sub-inspector of police, Savithri (Varsha Bollamma). Whether or not she falls in love with him forms the crux of the story.

Cast 
Vishnu as Arivu
Varsha Bollamma as Savithri, a sub-inspector
Ishaara Nair as Priya
K. Bhagyaraj as Love Guru
Jayaprakash as Arivu's father
Bagavathi Perumal, Aruldoss, and Ramachandran Durairaj as the Bombay Boys
Arjunan as Arivu's friend
Rajkumar as Arivu's friend

Production 
Vishnu, Varsha Bollamma, and Ishaara Nair were signed to feature in a film helmed by debutante Suresh Kumar. Veteran actor K. Bhagyaraj  was signed to portray the character of a love guru.

Soundtrack 
The songs were composed by N. R. Raghunanthan.

Release 
The film was originally scheduled to release on 24 March, but was postponed to 29 June since there were nine other films releasing on that date in March. The satellite rights of the film were sold to Colors Tamil.

Reception 
Maalaimalar wrote that "Director Sureshkumar has tried to mix love and comedy in his first film. The first half of the film is very slow, but the second half is very lively. He made an entertaining movie that people can watch as a family". Ananda Vikatan gave the film a more unfavourable review and wrote that "Director S. Suresh Kumar has a lot of talent as shown by the beginning and ending of the film" but criticized the middle part of the film.

References

External links 

Indian romantic comedy-drama films
2017 romantic comedy-drama films
2010s Tamil-language films
2017 comedy films
2017 drama films